Savé Airport  is a public use airport located near Savé, Collines, Benin.

References

External links 
 Airport record for Savé Airport at Landings.com

Airports in Benin
Collines Department